Loch Lomond is an unincorporated community in Lake County, California. It lies at an elevation of 2,818 feet (859 m). The ZIP code is 95461, which is shared with Middletown. Unofficially, and perhaps incorrectly, 95426, which belongs to neighboring Cobb, California is often used. The community is inside area code 707.

Description
Loch Lomond is a small mountain resort with a population of 420 and was called "Little Italy" many years ago.  Private resorts such as Italian Village and Biggi's Family Club still thrive with summer activities.  Visitors will find lodging, a private campground, plus a grocery store with deli, mailing services, Roadhouse restaurant and bar as well as Giovanni's coffee shop nearby. The village also has a community swimming pool which is the oldest continually operating Olympic sized pool in California.

On the west side of the highway is the Loch Lomond Vernal Pool Ecological Reserve, a vernal pond managed by the California Fish and Game.

Government

References

Unincorporated communities in California
Unincorporated communities in Lake County, California
Resorts in Lake County, California